Nikola Yordanov (23 October 1938 – 31 July 1991) was a Bulgarian association football player. He was the top scorer of the 1962 championship (with 23 goals for Dunav Ruse). 

A native of Ruse, Yordanov played as a forward for Dunav Ruse, Spartak Pleven and Lokomotiv Ruse.

Starting from 2011, an international youth tournament is being held every summer in Ruse, to honor Nikola Yordanov.

References

1938 births
1991 deaths
Bulgarian footballers
Bulgaria international footballers
FC Dunav Ruse players
First Professional Football League (Bulgaria) players
Association football forwards
Sportspeople from Ruse, Bulgaria